Washington County School District is a school district headquartered in Chatom, Alabama, serving Washington County.

Schools

K-12:
Fruitdale High School
Leroy High School
Millry High School

High schools
McIntosh High School
Washington County High School

Elementary schools:
 Chatom Elementary School
 McIntosh Elementary School

Other:
 Washington County Career Technical Center

References

External links
 

Education in Washington County, Alabama
School districts in Alabama